Alexander Astor  (11 August 1900 – 24 June 1988) was a New Zealand rabbi and community leader.

In 1953, Astor was awarded the Queen Elizabeth II Coronation Medal. In the 1968 Queen's Birthday Honours, he was appointed an Officer of the Order of the British Empire.

References

1900 births
1988 deaths
New Zealand Jews
Finnish emigrants to New Zealand
New Zealand Officers of the Order of the British Empire
New Zealand rabbis